Medary (also Winona Junction) is an unincorporated community located in the town of Medary, La Crosse County, Wisconsin, United States. The Great River State Trail has its trailhead located here.

History
The La Crosse, Trempealeau & Prescott Railroad chartered to build from a point across the river from Winona, Minnesota to connect with the Chicago, Milwaukee and St. Paul railroad. This rail junction originally was called Trempealeau Junction, but later became Winona Junction. The railroad was consolidated with the Chicago and Northwestern Railroad June 6, 1877. The area was renamed in honor of Samuel Medary, an American politician. A community post office operated under the name Medary in 1895 until 1900.

See also

Medary, Wisconsin - the surrounding town

Notes

Unincorporated communities in La Crosse County, Wisconsin
Unincorporated communities in Wisconsin